Sanyang is a Gambian surname. Notable people with the surname include:

Abdoulie Sanyang (born 1999), Gambian footballer
Amadou Sanyang (born 1991), Gambian footballer
Ismaila Sanyang, Gambian Agricultural Minister 
Kukoi Sanyang (1952–2013), Gambian rebel

Gambian surnames